Uriel Menachem Buso (born 13 September 1973) is an Israeli politician who serves as a member of the Knesset for Shas.

Biography
Burso was born the ninth of ten children in Ramla. His mother Heftziba is the daughter of the Moroccan-born Mayor and Chief Rabbi of Ramla, Yitzhak Abihatsira, commonly referred to as "the Baba Khaki", and his father is an immigrant from Argentina who studied at Porat Yosef Yeshiva.

On 8 February 2011, Busso was arrested along with the mayor of Petah Tikvah, Itzik Ohayun, on suspicion of corruption, namely taking bribes and undisclosed finances. In March 2011, the Israeli authorities stated that they had enough to prosecute them. However, in 2013, the State Attorney office dropped the charges, saying that there was not enough evidence for wrongdoing.

Buso survived an apparent assassination attempt in 2014, when a bomb exploded under his car. No one was injured in the attack, as the vehicle was unoccupied at the time, but Buso said he was shaken by the attack, and that he had not previously received any threats.

Buso entered the Knesset after failing to be elected in the 2019 or 2020 elections, but succeeded the resigning Aryeh Deri due to the Norwegian Law.

He lives in Petah Tikvah, and is married, with six children. In 2019, his eldest son was married in a ceremony attended by Yitzhak Yosef, Shlomo Amar, Aryeh Deri, and Yuli Edelstein. He earned a Bachelor's Degree in law, at Ono Academic College.

References

External links

1973 births
Living people
Israeli Jews
Israeli Orthodox Jews
Israeli people of Argentine-Jewish descent
Israeli people of Moroccan-Jewish descent
Jewish Israeli politicians
Members of the 23rd Knesset (2020–2021)
Members of the 24th Knesset (2021–2022)
Members of the 25th Knesset (2022–)
People from Ramla
Shas politicians
Ono Academic College alumni